Pripovedi is the second studio album by Slovene musician Tomaž Pengov. He took eight years, from 1980 to 1988, to record this album, recorded with guest musicians. The music is still acoustic, but more varied.

Track listing 
All songs written by Tomaž Pengov.

Side one
 "Rodovnik vina" – 4:10
 "Prišla je" – 3:25
 "Pegam in Lambergar" – 6:10
 "Starec in morska zvezda" – 4:10

Side two
 "Vanitas" – 3:05
 "Vrnitev" – 3:45
 "Tihe so njive" – 3:18
 "Dolga reka" – 4:30
 "Bela izba" – 4:18

Personnel 
 Tomaž Pengov – accoutic guitar, 12-string lute, vocals
 Matjaž Sekne - viola
 Emil Krečan - horns
 Lado Jakša - piano, organ, saxophone, flute, clarinet
 Bogdana Herman - female vocals
 Matevž Smerkol - bass, double bass
 Aleš Rendla - drums, tam tam, maracas
 Meta Arnold - flute
 Igor Leonardi - oug, bongos
 Drago Golob - oboe
 Jerko Novak - guitar
 Stanko Arnold - trumpet
 Matjaž Vipotnik - artwork
 Aco Razbornik - recorder

1988 albums
Tomaž Pengov albums